The 15th European Women's Artistic Gymnastics Championships were held in Helsinki, Finland on 11-12 May 1985.

Medalists

All-around

Vault Final

Uneven bars

Balance beam

Floor exercise

References 

1985
European Artistic Gymnastics Championships
1985 in European sport
International sports competitions hosted by Finland
Gymnastics competitions in Finland
1985 in Finnish sport